Szilvia Mednyánszky (born January 2, 1971 in Győr) is a Hungarian sprint canoer who competed in the mid-1990s. She won five medals at the ICF Canoe Sprint World Championships with a gold (K-4 200 m: 1994), three silvers (K-2 500 m: 1993, 1994; K-4 500 m: 1994) and a bronze (K-4 500 m: 1995).

Mednyánsky also competed at the 1996 Summer Olympics in Atlanta, finishing fourth in the K-2 500 m and ninth in the K-4 500 m events.

Awards
 Hungarian kayaker of the Year (1): 1997

References

Sports-reference.com profile

1971 births
Canoeists at the 1996 Summer Olympics
Hungarian female canoeists
Living people
Olympic canoeists of Hungary
ICF Canoe Sprint World Championships medalists in kayak
Sportspeople from Győr
20th-century Hungarian women